Powered by the Apocalypse (PbtA) is a tabletop role playing game design framework developed by Meguey Baker and Vincent Baker for the 2010 game Apocalypse World and later used for Dungeon World, Monsterhearts and numerous other RPGs.

Vincent Baker wrote that PbtA "isn't the name of a category of games, a set of games' features, or the thrust of any games' design. It's the name of Meg's and my policy concerning others' use of our intellectual property and creative work. [...] Again, 'Powered by the Apocalypse' isn't the name of a kind of game, set of game elements, or even the core design thrust of a coherent movement. (Ha! This last, the least so.) Its use in a game's trade dress signifies ONLY that the game was inspired by Apocalypse World in a way that the designer considers significant, and that it follows our policy [with respect to] others' use of our creative work".

Mechanics 

Powered by the Apocalypse games are centered on resolving what characters do as Moves. Characters have access to a default selection of moves based on the expectations of the game setting. In the fantasy game Dungeon World, characters have access to a hack and slash move, as combat is central to the dungeoneering experience. Alternatively, Apocalypse World has a "seize by force" move, as the game assumes a setting where collecting scarce resources is part of the game-play experience. Apocalypse World, Dungeon World, and most other PbtA games are class-based. Character classes have access to a number of class-specific moves.

Moves are resolved by rolling two six-sided dice and adding the relevant modifier, should modifiers be a mechanic in the game. Success levels fall on a scale of total success, partial success, or failure—referred to as a "miss" in the system.

Reception and analysis
In addition to other awards won, Apocalypse World won the 2010 Indie RPG Award for Most Innovative Game and Dungeon World won the 2013 ENnie award for Best Rules.

Multiple reviews discuss how the system's reliance on moves provides a streamlined focus on the fiction. Academic PS Berge wrote, "Vincent and Meguey Baker's Apocalypse World (AW, 2010) marked the beginning of a critical era in 'fiction-first' TRPG design. [...] A violent, dystopian, wasteland-punk game, AW itself is less important to the legacy of independent TRPGs than the Baker's invitation to other designers: 'If you've created a game inspired by Apocalypse World, and would like to publish it, please do'. [...] What designates a game as PbtA is complicated. [...] Instead, the label is an unpoliced 'homage' – designers may choose to signal a relationship between their game and AW using the label and a logo. In other words, 'PbtA' is not a branding or a mechanical linkage to AW's system but a mark of ludic etymology". Emily VanDerWerff, for Vox, highlighted that "in PBTA games, players roll two six-sided dice (or D6s) to determine whether they succeed or fail at tasks set for them by the game master. The GM, in turn, keeps things moving and tries to preserve a modicum of continuity. But the players also have extreme amounts of leeway to help shape the world and their relationships with other characters. That stripped-down simplicity makes PBTA games a natural fit for people spreading their wings either as players or game masters".

Bitch magazine has commented on the messy interconnected relationships the system produces. Berge also commented on the messy nature of characters in PbtA games and highlighted that many PbtA games "actively support queer narrative". Screen Rant highlighted Vincent Baker's game design theory articles; specifically, "designers building their own 'Powered By The Apocalypse' games will learn from posts that talk about how to construct 'Moves,' how to refine a game through iteration, and how to move the themes of a 'PBTA' game away from conflict and towards other transformative experiences".

Keerthi Sridharan, for Polygon, wrote:Games that use the PbtA label are ones that take their cues from Apocalypse World regarding any number of things: running a session zero, how dice mechanics work, or even aesthetic and design elements. While I’d still highly recommend getting into Apocalypse World, there are so many different ways to get into other PbtA-style games. In Magpie Games’ Velvet Glove you can be a ’70s high school girl gang; in Evil Hat’s Monster of the Week you can be a group of monster-hunting detectives. [...] How about Adam Schwaninger’s Peace Was Never An Option, which stars a gaggle of geese tearing up the town. You could also try my personal favorite, Masks: A New Generation, which stars a coupla goddamn kids who are, obviously, secretly superheroes. The possibilities are endless: There are over 500 PbtA rulebooks available for perusal and/or purchase on itch.io alone. They don’t all have the same exact rules, of course, but most are newbie-friendly.James Hanna, for CBR in 2020, discussed the lasting impact of the PbtA framework on role-playing game design. Hanna wrote, "ten years on, Powered by the Apocalypse games (PbtA) are everywhere. The Bakers designed the PbtA engine so that other game designers could 'hack' it, creating games with similar mechanics, but unique worlds and rules. More than four dozen games bear the PbtA license, making Apocalypse World incredibly influential. That influence continues to be felt as games move into new territories and find new audiences. [...] The result of that empowerment is a thriving and diverse community of PbtA games, each with its own unique flavor and design. [...] Because the PbtA mechanics are so flexible, any kind of game is possible". Hanna, in another article for CBR, compared PbtA to Dungeons & Dragons. He wrote that "the differences really come down to crunch and conversation. Players looking for a sandbox or linear adventure with lots of crunchy combat will enjoy D&D in all its glorious variety. Those who want a more collaborative storytelling experience with fewer granular choices (and probably less math) should try PbtA games. There are so many of them, they are fairly inexpensive, and once you become familiar with the basic rules, they are easy to learn".

List of games 

Because of the simplicity and the flexibility of the Powered by the Apocalypse engine, and Vincent Baker's encouragement of publishing hacks, there are at least four dozen fan-made hacks that have reached the point of public playtesting. This list only covers the ones actually published.

A list of Powered by the Apocalypse games who have obtained permission to use the mark is available on the Apocalypse World website.

 Alas for the Awful Sea Alas for the Awful Sea, designed by Vee Hendro and Hayley Gordon, is a game about a ship's crew in the 19th century navigating the remote corners of the British Isles in a world consumed with suspicion, sadness, and desperation. It is published by Storybrewers.
 Apocalypse World Apocalypse World is the post-apocalyptic game the system was created for and is set after an unspecified apocalypse (which may either be specified in the course of play or left a mystery) that created a psychic maelstrom.
 Avatar Legends Avatar Legends: The Roleplaying Game, designed by Magpie Games, is set in the world of Nickelodeon's Avatar: The Last Airbender. Taking you through numerous eras of the series, Avatar Legends: The Roleplaying Game lets you engage with tales long past and tales yet to be told as you take control of elemental benders, masters of weapons, or wielders of new-fangled technologies.
 City of Mist City of Mist, designed by Son of Oak Game Studio, is set in a modern-day metropolis where ordinary people of all walks of life become modern-day reincarnations of myths, legends, and fairy tales, gaining magical powers and abilities. The game's narrative driven engine is partially based on the Powered by the Apocalypse game engine and the tag system featured in free RPG Lady Blackbird.
 Dungeon World Dungeon World is a fantasy game, created by Sage LaTorra and Adam Koebel. The game is advertised as having old-school style with modern rules. The text of the game was released under the Creative Commons Attribution 3.0 Unported License. The setting for Dungeon World is Dungeons & Dragons-esque fantasy. Rather than present a pre-written setting, the game master is instructed to "Draw maps and leave blanks", meaning to not put too much detail in the setting but allow it to emerge in play.
 Epyllion Epyllion is a game where you play dragons in a dragon-centric world, published by Magpie Games.
 Farflung Farflung was written by Friedrich Wallenhaupt, with Norman Rafferty and Robert Vance, and published by Sanguine Productions in 2017. It is set in a generic whimsical far-future setting inspired by The Hitchhiker's Guide to the Galaxy, Barbarella and other inspirations. The game offers 24 Playbooks each for a character class ranging from mundane to unusual SF personalities.
 Fellowship Fellowship is a high fantasy game where players control every aspect of their chosen race. The player who controls the Elf, for example, is the only person who has the final say in anything regarding elves. The goal is to defeat the Overlord, a GM-controlled character, by gathering sources of power while trying to prevent the Overlord from destroying communities that could be helpful in defeating them. The game was successfully Kickstarted in 2015 and released in 2016 by LibriGothica Games.
 Ironsworn In the Ironsworn tabletop roleplaying game, you are a hero sworn to undertake perilous quests in the dark fantasy setting of the Ironlands. You will explore untracked wilds, fight desperate battles, forge bonds with isolated communities, and reveal the secrets of this harsh land.  Created by Shawn Tomkin
 KULT – Divinity Lost KULT: Divinity Lost is a reboot of the contemporary horror role-playing game Kult, originally released in 1991. This Kickstarter-funded version of the game features a completely new rule-set, and the setting is updated to present day. Published by Swedish Helmgast and distributed by Modiphius.
 Legacy – Life Among the Ruins Legacy: Life Among the Ruins is a game of survival and rebuilding in a world ravaged and altered by incomprehensible calamity. Its biggest feature is gameplay at multiple levels: each player builds a Family of survivors and a Character from that family. Stories take place across multiple generations, with each generation creating new characters and altering the families. Family stats are Reach, Grasp, Tech, and Mood, with playbooks including The Enclave of Bygone Lore, The Brotherhood of Gilded Merchants, The Tyrant Kings, The Servants of the One True Faith, and The Lawgivers of the Wasteland. Character stats are Steel, Sway, Force, and Lore, with playbooks including the Hunter, the Envoy, the Seeker, and the Sentinel. Legacy was designed by Mina McJanda (published under the name James Iles), and was successfully crowdfunded on Kickstarter in December 2014. After another successful Kickstarter campaign, a second edition was released in June 2018.
 MASHED MASHED explores life in a Mobile Army Surgical Hospital (MASH) during the Korean War. Default statistics are Luck, Nerve, Skill, and Tough. The character playbooks are the Angel (nurse), Corpsman, Cowboy (pilot or mechanic), Cutter (surgeon), Doc (physician), Grunt (aka pogue), and Padre (chaplain). Designed by Mark Plemmons, MASHED was Kickstarted in October 2016 and published by Brabblemark Press in January 2017.
 Masks Masks focuses on the lives of a team of teenage superheroes, inspired by the Young Avengers, Teen Titans, and Marvel's Runaways. The playbooks include the Beacon, the Bull, the Doomed, the Legacy, the Janus, the Transformed, the Protégé, the Delinquent, the Nova, and the Outsider. It was successfully funded on Kickstarter in fall of 2015 and subsequently published by Magpie Games.
 Monsterhearts Monsterhearts is "a story game about the lives of teenage monsters" by Avery Alder. Default statistics are Hot, Cold, Volatile, and Dark, and the playbooks presented in the main rulebook are The Chosen, the Fae, the Ghoul, the Queen, the Witch, the Werewolf, the Infernal, and the Vampire. It was nominated for six separate awards, although it didn't win any.
 Monster of the Week Monster of the Week is "an action-horror role playing game" about a group of monster hunters, written by Michael Sands. Statistics are Charm, Cool, Sharp, Tough, and Weird and the default classes are the Chosen, the Expert, the Flake, the Initiate, the Monstrous, the Mundane, the Professional, the Divine, the Spooky, and the Wronged.
 Offworlders Offworlders is a framework based on the rules lite variant, World of Dungeons, for creating space based games.
 Root RPG Root: the Roleplaying Game is a tabletop roleplaying game based on the Root: A Game of Woodland Might & Right board game. Root is a game of woodland creatures fighting for money, justice, and freedom from powers far greater than them. The players take on the roles of vagabonds, outcasts from the normal society of the woodlands. Written by Brendan Conway of Magpie Games, it is officially licensed by Leder Games and created and published by Magpie Games. The project launched on Kickstarter on September 17, 2019, with an initial goal of $10,000, and raised as much in 30 minutes. 
Ruma – Dawn of Empire
 Ruma: Dawn of Empire is a game by Martin Greening. The game is set in an alternate Roman Empire, called the Ruman Empire, where magic and mythology also exists. The project was launched on Kickstarter where it was successfully funded, having raised $10,046.
 Sagas of the Icelanders The game Sagas of the Icelanders is set "sometime after the year 874, when the first Norse settlers set foot on Iceland. They were escaping war, poverty and the dissolution of their political freedoms on the mainland." Statistics are Versed, Young, Gendered, and Wyrd. Default classes are The Child, the Woman, the Man, the Matriarch, the Godi, the Seidkona, the Wanderer, the Shield-Maiden, the Huscarl, the Thrall, and the Monster.
 Spirit of 77 Spirit of 77 is an action RPG based on 1970s pop culture, including The Six Million Dollar Man, Shaft, and the Dukes of Hazzard. Popular music of the time plays heavily into its gameplay, including the option for players to play 1970s "rockers", ala Fleetwood Mac and Kiss. The game includes multiple adventures packaged as "Double Features", including titles such as "Women's Prison of the Apes", "BEAST: Bound and Down", and "Jurassic Parking Lot". Published by Monkeyfun Studios.
 The Sprawl The Sprawl is a cyberpunk RPG in which parties of underground criminals run missions for and/or against vast megacorporations while trying to avoid exposure and extermination. William Gibson's Sprawl trilogy is cited as a major inspiration. Graphics, editing, and supplemental fiction for the RPG were funded via Kickstarter. Game books began releasing in early 2016.
 StarholdStarhold is a space-themed survival horror developed by S.M. Noble. There are 8 Spacer playbooks, each of which has 3 additional variants, allowing for 32 different unique Spacers to choose from. Starhold was released in September 2020.
 Strange World Strange World: An Exploratory Roleplaying Game is a small booklet containing an indie RPG designed by Aaron M. Sturgill. It is a sci-fi adventure about astronauts whose ship has crashed on a distant alien world. Their only option is to explore this planet (rendered hexcrawl-style) and try to find resources to repair their ship. There are no known alien lifeforms in the universe at this point... or are there?
 Thirsty Sword Lesbians Thirsty Sword Lesbians is a 2021 narrative-focused role-playing game which emphasizes telling "melodramatic and queer stories". It was developed by April Kit Walsh and published by Evil Hat Productions. The base game has nine playbooks (Beast, Chosen, Devoted, Infamous, Nature Witch, Scoundrel, Seeker, Spooky Witch, and Trickster) and characters have five main stats: daring, grace, heart, wit and spirit. Thirsty Sword Lesbians was the first tabletop game to win a Nebula Award and the fourth winner in the "Best Game Writing" category. The game also won the 2022 ENNIE Awards for "Best Game" and for "Product of the Year".
 Transit – The Spaceship RPG
 Transit: The Spaceship RPG is a 2019 science fiction game of Artificial Intelligence, interstellar craft, and galactic exploration. Players take on the role of AI inhabiting interplanetary vessels, with different AI Types and Ship Classes combining to form unique characters. The fleet will expand the universe through play while contending with the needs of their headquarters, external threats ranging from hostile ships to bizarre cosmic phenomena, and even their own biological crews. Transit is sold exclusively through DriveThruRPG, and is published by Fiddleback Productions.
 Tremulus A storytelling RPG in the style of the works of H. P. Lovecraft, Tremulus was Kickstarted and raised over $60,000. Statistics are Reason, Passion, Might, Luck, and Affinity, and the default classes are The Alienist, The Antiquarian, The Author, The Devout, The Detective, The Dilettante, The Doctor, The Heir, The Journalist, The Professor, and The Salesman. There were plans for the kickstarter to produce a "The Congo" playset, allowing characters to explore "the Heart of Darkness"; this idea was dropped after a backlash.
 Uncharted Worlds Successfully backed on Kickstarter, Uncharted Worlds is "a Space Opera pen-and-paper roleplaying game of exploration, combat, politics and commerce across the stars." Designed by Sean Gomes.
 Urban Shadows Urban Shadows is an urban fantasy game set in "a dark urban environment drowning in supernatural politics", with Archetypes including vampires, werewolves, wizards, ghosts and human monster hunters using the main stats of Blood, Heart, Mind, and Spirit. Urban Shadows introduces systems to emphasize the political, tragic, and horrific aspects of the genre: characters must interact with different Factions to advance, or mark Corruption to gain unique and powerful moves while drawing closer to being retired from play dead or to become antagonists. Written by Andrew Medeiros and Mark Diaz Truman and published by Truman's Magpie Games as a result of a successful Kickstarter campaign. 2016 Ennie Award Nominee for Best Game
 The Warren The Warren is a game that involves "intelligent rabbits trying to make the best of a world filled with hazards, predators and, worst of all, other rabbits. It is a game about survival and community." Published in 2016, "This game takes inspiration from classic rabbit tales such as Watership Down, Fifteen Rabbits, and Peter Rabbit. It uses a heavily-modified version of the game mechanics from Vincent Baker’s Apocalypse World."
 Worlds in Peril Worlds in Peril is a tabletop roleplaying game designed to tell collaborative stories about superheroes taking on both the challenges faced as a superhero, with the villains and public image and fame (or perhaps infamy) that goes along with it, as well as the challenges they face in their personal lives when they take off the mask and have to deal with everyday problems and relationships like everybody else. Designed by Kyle Simons, Adam Bosarge, Jason Faulk.

References

External links

Indie role-playing games
Role-playing game systems